2,4,5-Trichlorophenol is an organochloride with the molecular formula C6H3Cl3O1. 2,4,5-Trichlorophenol has been used as a  fungicide and herbicide.

References

See also
 Agent Orange
 2,4,5-Trichlorophenoxyacetic acid
 2,4-Dichlorophenoxyacetic acid

Organochlorides
Fungicides
Herbicides
Phenols